Founded in 1948 as Jungle Aviation and Radio Service by William Cameron Townsend, JAARS is a world-wide, non-profit, mission aviation and support organization that reduces barriers and eases burdens with a primary focus on Bible translation support operations. JAARS provides practical support in aviation, land and maritime transportation, information technology and media. Its current president is Steve Russell, as of October 1, 2022. 

JAARS is a wholly controlled subsidiary of SIL International, but also partners extensively with other organizations such as Wycliffe Bible Translators.

Operations and activities
JAARS typically doesn't start and operate its own programs overseas, instead working with local field partners. The type of involvement varies, depending on the location, partner and other factors.

JAARS Center
JAARS' headquarters in North Carolina are commonly referred to as the "JAARS Center". The center is operated by over 500 people on 551 acres, encompassing 68 buildings. While the JAARS Center serves as the home for all the organization's core operations (like transportation), it also hosts staff from partner organizations. For example, SIL International has both IT and media staff working at the JAARS Center, and Wycliffe Bible Translators USA has a large contingent of human resources personnel with offices at the center. The center's airport is registered with the FAA as JAARS-Townsend Airport , a public-use airport. The public use runway is 3,309' x 40' listed as good asphalt. Additionally, three grass runways are used by JAARS for standards training.

Aviation

In aviation, JAARS helps its field partners start and run local aviation programs. This help comes in the form of training staff, setting standards, equipping aircraft, research and more.

In turn, these partners provide a range of transportation services to a variety of people, including translators, support personnel, consultants, trainers, linguists, Christian mission organizations, hospitals, local people and governments. These services can also include medical evacuations and disaster relief work.

JAARS' aviation partners fly a variety of aircraft, including:
 Bell LongRanger helicopter, flown by SIL International in Papua New Guinea
 Robinson R66 helicopter, flown at the JAARS Center and by SIL International in Cameroon
 Cessna 206, flown at the JAARS Center and by partners in Brazil, Cameroon, and Papua New Guinea
 Cessna 207, Soloy Turbine conversion, flown by SIL International in Cameroon
 Helio Courier, flown at the JAARS Center
 Pilatus PC-12, flown by YAJASI in Indonesia
 Pilatus PC-6, flown at the JAARS Center and by YAJASI in Indonesia
 Quest Kodiak, flown by SIL International in Papua New Guinea

JAARS was one of fifteen organizations that financed the prototyping and development of the Quest Kodiak.

History
William Cameron Townsend co-founded Wycliffe Bible Translators in 1934, and as the organization grew, he saw the need for airplanes and radio to reach remote areas around the world and to provide safe access to language groups. JAARS was originally formed as Jungle Aviation and Radio Service in Peru in 1948 and moved to its current location in Waxhaw, North Carolina, in 1961. The 572 acres of land where JAARS is located was donated by the Belk family. In 1986, as a result of diversifying activities (like information technology), JAARS officially dropped the original meaning behind the acronym and became simply "JAARS Inc."

Museums
JAARS operates two separate museums at its headquarters campus in Waxhaw, North Carolina:
 The Museum of the Alphabet was established in 1991 by JAARS founder William Cameron Townsend and focuses on the development of the alphabet and the history of writing systems and written languages. Exhibits include maps, paintings, sculptures, a copy of the Rosetta Stone, a Torah scroll that is over 150 years old and a handmade lyre. The languages covered include Greek, Arabic, Hebrew, Cyrillic and African languages.
 The Mexico-Cardenas Museum was established in 1977 by Townsend with a focus on Mexican culture and Lázaro Cárdenas, Mexico's president from 1934 to 1940. Cárdenas was close friends with Townsend, who led early efforts to study Mexican languages. Exhibits include Mexican folk art, photos, artifacts and clothing.

References

External links
 JAARS.org
 JAARS Flight demonstration of Helio Courier landing (YouTube)
 
 
 Missions Box Bio: William Cameron Townsend
 

Christian missions
Evangelical parachurch organizations
Non-profit organizations based in North Carolina
Union County, North Carolina
Organizations established in 1948